John Beauchamp or John de Beauchamp may refer to:

John de Beauchamp (MP for New Shoreham) ( 1330s), English politician
John Beauchamp (MP for New Shoreham) (fl. 1330s–1340s), may well be the same person as the one above
John de Beauchamp of Fifield, Member of Parliament for Essex, 1290
John de Beauchamp, 1st Baron Beauchamp (first creation) (1274–1336)
John de Beauchamp, 2nd Baron Beauchamp (first creation) (1304–1343) of Somerset
John de Beauchamp, 1st Baron Beauchamp (second creation) ( 1316–1360), also known as 1st Baron Beauchamp de Warwick
John de Beauchamp, 3rd Baron Beauchamp (1329–1361), also known as 3rd Baron Beauchamp de Somerset
John de Beauchamp, 1st Baron Beauchamp (fourth creation) (died 1388), administrator and landowner, also known as 1st Baron Beauchamp of Kidderminster
John Beauchamp (died 1420), MP for Worcestershire 1401, 1404, 1414
John Beauchamp, 1st Baron Beauchamp (fifth creation) (c. 1400–1475), nobleman and administrator
John Beauchamp (Plymouth Company) (1592–1655), backer of the Plymouth Company
John Beauchamp (cricketer) (1825–1911), English  cricketer

See also
Baron Beauchamp, multiple other individuals